Patience Collier (born Irene Marjorie Ritscher; 19 August 1910 – 13 July 1987) was a British actress.

Career

Patience Collier began her theatrical career in Manchester.

In 1956 she played Maria in Denis Cannan and Pierre Bost's The Power and the Glory opposite Brian Wilde, Roger Delgado and Paul Scofield at the Phoenix Theatre. The same year, she appeared as a "delightful vignette" opposite John Gielgud in Noël Coward's Nude with Violin, which appeared in Dublin in the September.

From 25 May 1966, she appeared in Sławomir Mrożek's play Tango at the Aldwych Theatre alongside Ursula Mohan, Mike Pratt, Peter Jeffrey and Dudley Sutton under director Trevor Nunn.

On television, she appeared as Katerina Matakis in Who Pays the Ferryman and Emma Mullrine in Sapphire & Steel.
She played a retiring schoolteacher, in the 1973 episode, 'The Classroom', in ITV (TV channel)'s 'The Frighteners', with Clive Swift.

In film, Collier appeared in The Third Secret (1964), Decline and Fall... of a Birdwatcher (1968), Baby Love (1969), House of Cards (1969), Perfect Friday (1970), Every Home Should Have One (1970), Fiddler on the Roof (1971), Countess Dracula (1971), Endless Night (1972) and The French Lieutenant's Woman (1981), and appeared in TV series such as  The Avengers, in the "Crescent Moon" episode (1961), David Copperfield (1974–75), Edward the Seventh (1975), Love in a Cold Climate (1980), and The Pickwick Papers (1985). She portrayed Elizabeth I several times, including in the 1978 TV series Will Shakespeare.

Personal life
She was married to scientist Henry Oswald Jackson Collier and had three children with him. Her daughters, Susan and Sarah became noted textiles designers, founding the company, Collier Campbell. Her son is Joe Collier, a clinical pharmacologist.

Filmography

References

External links

"The Performer's Tale: The Nine Lives of Patience Collier" book by Vanessa Morton 

1910 births
1987 deaths
20th-century English actresses
English stage actresses
Actresses from London
English film actresses